Teuvo Henri Matias Teräväinen (born 11 September 1994) is a Finnish professional ice hockey winger currently playing for the Carolina Hurricanes of the National Hockey League (NHL). Nicknamed "Turbo", he was selected in the first round, 18th overall, of the 2012 NHL Entry Draft by the Chicago Blackhawks after playing several seasons with the Jokerit organization in Finland. Also being drafted by the Kontinental Hockey League (KHL)'s Lokomotiv Yaroslavl in the 2011 KHL Junior Draft, he is known for his offensive abilities and play-making skills. In 2015, Teräväinen won a Stanley Cup as a member of the Blackhawks.

Playing career

Jokerit
A product of Jokerit's youth system, Teräväinen made his SM-liiga debut on 18 October 2011 at age 17. He quickly established his place in the first team and played 40 games en route to winning the Jarmo Wasama memorial trophy for rookie of the year. During the season, he then entered the 2012 NHL Entry Draft and was ranked as the second best skater out of Europe by the NHL Central Scouting Bureau. He was ultimately selected in the first round, 18th overall, by the Chicago Blackhawks.

In his second season in the SM-liiga, Teräväinen played 44 games and scored 31 points. In the following August, he signed a three-year, entry-level contract with the Blackhawks. Teräväinen subsequently participated in Blackhawks' training camp, but returned to Jokerit for the 2013–14 season.

After Jokerit star centre Ilari Filppula moved to CSKA Moscow of the KHL, Teräväinen was promoted to become the team's new top-line centerman. However, he started the season relatively slowly, scoring just two points in his first nine games. However, Teräväinen eventually picked up his game and after a successful tournament at the World Junior Championships, went on a 13-game point streak, scoring 5 goals and 18 assists. He ended the season with 44 points in 49 games. He was named team captain of Jokerit when their captain went down with injury.

Chicago Blackhawks

Teräväinen made his debut for the Blackhawks on 25 March 2014. He scored his first career NHL goal on 16 January 2015 against the Winnipeg Jets. During Game 1 of the 2015 Stanley Cup Finals, Teräväinen scored the tying goal before stripping the puck from the Tampa Bay Lightning's J. T. Brown late in the third period, setting up the eventual game-winning goal scored by Antoine Vermette. He became the fourth-youngest player to ever score a goal in the Stanley Cup Final (at 20 years, 265 days) and the second-youngest to have a multi-point game in the Cup Final since 1990. He won his first Stanley Cup in 2015 with the Blackhawks in his rookie season, scoring ten points in the playoff run.

Carolina Hurricanes
On 15 June 2016, Teräväinen was traded to the Carolina Hurricanes (along with Bryan Bickell) in exchange for the New York Rangers' 2016 second-round draft pick (50th, acquired in the Eric Staal trade) and Chicago's own 2017 third-round pick. Following the trade, Hurricanes general manager Ron Francis spoke highly of him, saying: "his game improved this year on both sides of the puck...he has good hockey sense and skating ability. We've been a team that struggles to score goals. I think he will help us in 5-on-5 play and on the power play." In his first season with the Hurricanes, Teräväinen established career highs in games played, goals, assists, and points resulting in him signing a contract extension worth $2.86 million per season on 15 June 2017.

In the first year of his new contract, Teräväinen continued to produce offensively and surpassed his previous career-highs in goals, assists, and points. Teräväinen began the season playing on the Hurricanes top line alongside Jordan Staal and Sebastian Aho. Early in the season, Teräväinen scored his first natural hat-trick as a Hurricane on 13 November 2017 in a 5–1 win over the Dallas Stars. He recorded three straight goals within seven minutes and five seconds of each other, becoming the first Hurricane to record a natural hat trick since Eric Staal in 2010. As a result of the hat-trick, Teräväinen totaled 10 points in four games and was named NHL's First Star of the Week for the week of November 12 to 19. He ended the season with 23 goals and 41 assists for 64 points through 82 games as the Hurricanes failed to qualify for the 2018 Stanley Cup playoffs.

On 21 January 2019, Teräväinen signed a 5-year, $27 million contract extension with the Hurricanes, carrying an annual cap hit of $5.4 million. As the Hurricanes qualified for the 2019 Stanley Cup playoffs, he helped them reach the NHL Conference Finals after a series victories over the defending Stanley Cup champion Washington Capitals and the New York Islanders. Following their elimination to the Boston Bruins, Teräväinen ended the tournament leading the team with seven goals while his teammate Aho led the Hurricanes with 12 points.

After recording career highs in points and assists in 2018–19, Teravainen returned to the team in 2019–20 for his fourth consecutive season with the team. Prior to the season being shut down due to the COVID-19 pandemic, he led the Hurricanes with 48 assists. He helped lead the Hurricanes to the 2020 Stanley Cup playoffs, where they were eliminated by the Bruins in the first round.

Teräväinen missed the beginning of the 2020–21 season after being placed on NHL COVID-19 protocol on January 19. He eventually came of the protocol list on January 29 and joined the team for their game against the Chicago Blackhawks in February. However, a few games later, Teräväinen was diagnosed with a concussion as a result of a hit from Blackhawks defenceman Nikita Zadorov. He returned to the Hurricanes lineup in early March but, after playing for 14 minutes, experienced concussion-like symptoms. Teräväinen returned to the lineup for the remainder of the season on 27 April for a game against the Dallas Stars. He helped lead the Hurricanes to the 2021 Stanley Cup playoffs, where they were eliminated by the Tampa Bay Lightning in the second round.

International play

Teräväinen has represented Finland on several youth levels, most notably in the World Junior Championships. In the 2013 tournament, he scored 11 points, placing fourth in the tournament scoring. In the following year, he was named the captain of the team, leading Finland all the way to the final. In the final, Finland defeated Sweden 3–2 in overtime. Teräväinen assisted all three of Finland's goals and was the overall scoring leader of the tournament.

After the Carolina Hurricanes failed to make the 2018 playoffs, Teräväinen was named to the Finnish roster to compete at the 2018 IIHF World Championship.

Personal life

Teräväinen has a younger brother and sister. His father is a dentist. His brother Eero is a defenceman with HIFK of the Liiga and previously played with the Lincoln Stars of the United States Hockey League (USHL) and with the Finland men's national under-18 ice hockey team at the 2017 IIHF World U18 Championships. His sister, Satu, appeared at the 2019 IIHF Women's World U18 Championship with the Finnish women's national under-18 ice hockey team and played with Kiekko-Espoo of the Naisten Liiga, most recently during the 2019–20 season.

Career statistics

Regular season and playoffs

International

Awards and honors

Professional

International

References

External links 
 

1994 births
Living people
Carolina Hurricanes players
Chicago Blackhawks draft picks
Chicago Blackhawks players
Finnish ice hockey right wingers
Jokerit players
National Hockey League first-round draft picks
Rockford IceHogs (AHL) players
Ice hockey people from Helsinki
Stanley Cup champions